The 2007 Men's Australian Hockey League was the 17th edition of the men's field hockey tournament. The tournament was held from 23 February through to 1 April 2007 at various venues, before culminating in Perth for the finals.

QLD Blades won the tournament for the fifth time after defeating the WA Thundersticks 1–0 in the final. VIC Vikings finished in third place after defeating the Tassie Tigers 5–4 in the third and fourth place playoff.

Participating teams

 Canberra Lakers
 NSW Waratahs
 Territory Stingers
 QLD Blades
 Adelaide Hotshots
 Tassie Tigers
 VIC Vikings
 WA Thundersticks

Competition format
The 2007 Men's Australian Hockey League consisted of a single round robin format, followed by classification matches. 

Teams from all 8 states and territories competed against one another throughout the pool stage. At the conclusion of the pool stage, the top four ranked teams progressed to the semi-finals, while the bottom four teams continued to the classification stage.

The first four rounds of the pool stage comprised two-legged fixtures between states. As a result, matches in rounds five to seven of the pool stage were worth double points, due to the single-leg format.

Point allocation

Every match in the 2007 AHL needed an outright result. In the event of a draw, golden goal extra time was played out, and if the result was still a draw a penalty shoot-out was contested, with the winner receiving a bonus point.

Results

Preliminary round

Pool

Fixtures

Classification round

Fifth to eighth place classification

Crossover

Seventh and eighth place

Fifth and sixth place

First to fourth place classification

Semi-finals

Third and fourth place

Final

Awards

Statistics

Final standings

References

External links
Hockey Australia

2007
2007 in Australian field hockey